The SCW Diva Championship (also known as the SCW Women's Championship) was a women's professional wrestling championship in the Southern Championship Wrestling (SCW) promotion. The title remained active until August 2003 when Alexis Laree signed a developmental contract with World Wrestling Entertainment. The championship was brought back at SCW's final show, Blowout Bash, on November 20, 2004, where Lexie Fyfe defeated Brandi Wine to win the vacant title. Fyfe, an SCW mainstay, had specifically requested a match for the event.

The inaugural champion was Alexis Laree, who won a 6-woman "Diva Battle Royal", which included Lilly, Bubbles, Ariel Hope, and Cheyenne, by eliminating Persephone on April 26, 2001 at SCW's Royal Pain. There have been a total of 2 recognized champions who have had a combined 2 official reigns. The following is a chronological list of wrestlers that have been SCW Diva Champion by ring name.

Title history

Names

Reigns

References
General

Specific

External links
SCWprowrestling.com
SCW Wrestling Diva Title at Genickbruch.com

Southern Championship Wrestling championships
Women's professional wrestling championships